Nikola Boychev (born 4 January 1979) is a Bulgarian footballer currently playing for Kom-Minyor as a midfielder.

External links
 Profile at footballdatabase.eu

1979 births
Living people
Bulgarian footballers
First Professional Football League (Bulgaria) players
PFC Belasitsa Petrich players
PFC Kom-Minyor players
PFC Rilski Sportist Samokov players
Association football midfielders
People from Petrich
Sportspeople from Blagoevgrad Province